The 2021 Speedway European Championship season was the ninth season of the Speedway European Championship (SEC) era, and the 21st UEM Individual Speedway European Championship.

The title was won by Mikkel Michelsen, who beat Leon Madsen by two points.

Venues

Final classification

See also 
 2021 European Pairs Speedway Championship
 2021 Speedway Grand Prix

References 

2021
European Championship
Speedway European Championship